Jassa Singh Ramgarhia (1723–1803) was a prominent Sikh leader during the period of the Sikh Confederacy. He was the founder of the Ramgarhia Misl,

Early life
Jassa Singh Ramgarhia was born into a Sikh family with surname Sagoo in 1723. According to W. H. McLeod, his birthplace was the village of Ichogil, near Lahore, whilst H. S. Singha refers only to Lahore and Purnima Dhavan mentions origins in either Guga or Sur Singh, both near Amritsar. His father was named Bhagwan Singh, who himself was the son of Hardas Singh. There is agreement among the sources that he was of Tarkhan origin and was originally named Jassa Singh Thokar (Jassa Singh the Carpenter). He had four brothers - Jai Singh, Khushal Singh, Mali Singh Ramgarhia and Tara Singh - and became head of the family when his father, Giani Bhagwan Singh, died.

Jassa Singh rose to command the Sikh misl that became later known as Ramgarhia and built a fort called Ram Rauni and Ramgarhia Bunga (watchtower) at Amritsar. He joined forces with Adina Beg, who appointed him a risaldar (commander), but switche Beg's siege and, in 1752, rebuilt the damaged fort. The edifice was renamed Ramgarh, from which he took his new name.

Jassa Singh's policies were in contrast to those of other misl leaders. The large size of Jassa Singh's territory aroused the jealousy of the other Sikh Misls. They did not want him to become too powerful and the ruler of a big region. At the height of his power, Jassa Singh's territory in the Bari Doab included Batala, Kaldnaur, Dinanagar, Sri Hargobindpur, Shahpur Kandi, Gurdaspur, Qadian, Ghuman, Matteval, and in the Jalandhar Doab, Urmur Tanda, Sarih, Miani, Garhdivala and Zahura. In the hills Kangra, Nurpur, Mandi and Chamba paid him a tribute of two lakh of rupees.

Military career

In 1758, After the death of Adina Beg he collaborate with Jai Singh Kanhaiya, He capture Sri Hargobindpur, and Miani and established his headquarters at Sri Hargobindpur

In 1763, he sacked Kasur along with Jai Singh Kanhaiya and Hari Singh Dhillon, the Ramgarhias and kanhaiyas share all their booty equally, on this occasion he tried to keep all the booty for himself, As a result, his relationship with Jai singh Kanhaiya deteriorated.

In 1765, Ahmad Shah Durrani invaded India for seventh time  in the winter of 1764–1765, During this campaign he constantly harassed by Sikhs, Qazi Nur Muhammad who was present in the Afghan army describes the numbers of engagements between Sikhs and Afghans, a battle was fought on the western bank of the Satluj opposite Rupar, it was morning and the Afghan army was hardly gone 3 km from the western bank of the Satluj, when they attacked by the Sikhs, The Afghans immediately stopped marching and got into regular formation of battle, Ahmad Shah Durrani was in the center with 6,000 choice soldiers, Shah Vali Khan, Jahan Khan, Shah Pasand Khan, Anzala Khan and others at the head of 12,000 troops were on the right Nasir Khan with 12,000 Baluchis was on the left, The Dal Khalsa also organised themselves in regular battle army
Jassa Singh Ahluwalia fearlessly stood like a mountain in the center close by him was Jassa Singh Thokah, looking like a lion in stature, the Qazi says that Ramgarhia has his own flag and war drum

In 1767, Ahmad Shah Durrani Invaded India for the eight time, while Ahamed Shah was crossing the river Beas, his passage was obstructed by Jassa Singh Ahluwalia and Jassa Singh Ramgarhia, a fierce contest took place in which Ahluwalia was severely wounded. He retired to Cis-Satluj areas, Ramgarhia who had succeeded Hari Singh Dhillon as a leader of Taruna Dal took command of Dal Khalsa

In 1770, he led a plundering expedition into the hills, he defeated Raja Ghamand Chand, the most powerful hill Raja in battle of Talwara on the banks of river Beas, Raja Ghamand Chand and other Rajas of hills become tributary to him, He realised tribute of about two lakhs of rupees from Kangra hill states.

A conflict between Jai Singh Kanhaiya and Jassa Singh Ramgarhia developed and the Bhangi Misl sardars also developed differences with Jai Singh Kanhaiya. A big battle was fought between Jai Singh, Charat Singh, and Jassa Singh Ahluwalia on one side and Bhangis, Ramgarhias and their associates on the other side. The Bhangi side lost the battle.

In 1775, Jassa Singh Ahluwalia one day was going to Achal near Batala, he was attacked by Jassa Singh Ramgarhia brothers Khushal singh, Tara singh, and Mali singh, Jassa Singh Ahluwalia was taken prisoner, Jassa Singh Ramgarhia apologized for the misbehaviour of his brothers and honorably returned Ahluwalia with gifts but, the differences between two increased, Jassa Singh Ahluwalia took the oath, He will drive Ramgarhias out of country

In 1778, Jai Singh Kanhaiya and Haqiqat Singh Kanhaiya supported by Jassa Singh Ahluwalia attacked him and exiled him to the desert of Hansi and Hisar, he set up his headquarters at Tosham

In March 1783, he come to know that Dal Khalsa under Jassa Singh Ahluwalia was advancing upon Delhi, he joined it at March 10, 1783, On 11 March, Dal Khalsa entered in the royal palaces in the red fort, In the Diwan-e- Am Sikh Jassa Singh Ahluwalia was placed on the throne of Delhi as Badshah Singh of Delhi by Sikhs, Through Ramgarhia was in minority, yet he challenged the Ahluwalia and called upon him to get down immediately. Both sides drew out swords and were about to pounce upon each other when Jassa Singh Ahluwalia at once renounced the honour, Ramgarhia detached the throne of Mughal emperor Aurangzeb (on which he ordered the death of 9th guru Guru Teg Bahadur ji) and brought it on elephants and kept it at Golden Temple, Amritsar. Even today it is present at the Golden Temple known as Ramgarhia Bunga.

In January 1784, Jassa Singh Ramgarhia and karam Singh Nirmala crossed the river Jamuna river, They plundered Sarsawa, Zabita Khan dispatched Qutabi Ranghar and Nahar Singh Gujjar with a contingent of troops to stop the Sikhs from entering his territories Zabita vakil visited Sikhs camp Jassa Singh Ramgarhia demanded Rs,50,000, for sparing  Zabita Khan territory, Zabita Khan paid Rs,10,000 and agreed to pay this amount as an annual tribute to Jassa Singh, They sacked Naula Village, Merat, Saharanpur, Muzaffarnagar. The Sikhs crossed Jamuna at Barari Ghat and returned home, Jassa Singh come back to Tosham to deposit his booty

In beginning of January 1785, Jassa Singh Ramgarhia along with Baghel Singh, Gurdit Singh of Ladwa passed over Jamuna river, They plundered the village and towns of Sadaat-e-Bara, Zabita Khan did not stir out of his fort of Ghausgarh, they crossed the Ganga river and entered Rohilakhand, On 13 January, the villages of Barsi and mahmudpur were laid waste, On 14 January, They sacked Chandausi the great center of about 2000 bankers, rich merchants and jewellers was thoroughly squeezed and booty worth a crore of rupees was obtained in two days and nights,

Jassa Singh now turned his attention towards the Panjab, Sharp differences had arisen between Jai Singh Kanhaiya and Maha Singh over the booty of Jammu, Maha Singh invited Jassa Singh Ramgarhia and Sansar Chand katoch. Both were enemies of Jai Singh Kanhaiya, Jassa Singh hurried from Tosham at the head of his whole force, and stopped at Jagraon, where Maha Singh agent's met him to form the plan of action, A Kanhaiya force tried to check Ramgarhias but failed a hard battle was fought near Achal, Jai Singh heir apparent Gurbaksh Singh Kanhaiya was killed in the engagement, Jassa Singh Ramgarhia recovered his all lost territories he established his headquarter at Batala.

Death and legacy

Jassa Singh Ramgarhia died in 1803 at the age of 80
An equestrian statue of Sardar Jassa Singh Ramgharia has been installed in Amritsar, Punjab.

See also
Baba Deep Singh
Nawab Kapur Singh
Ramgarhia Bunga

Notes

References

Further reading
"The heritage of the Sikhs" by Harbans Singh

The Sikh Commonwealth or Rise and Fall of Sikh Misls. (Date:2001, revised edition. )

External links

Indian Sikhs
Sikh warriors
History of Punjab
Punjabi people
1723 births
1803 deaths
Ramgarhia people